Vítor José Joaquim Pereira (born 27 August 1978) is a Portuguese retired footballer who played as a defensive midfielder, currently manager of Luxembourg club FC Mamer 32.

He amassed Primeira Liga totals of 69 matches and nine goals over six seasons, representing mainly Moreirense. He also appeared in the competition for Braga and União de Leiria.

Playing career
Pereira was born in Vieira do Minho, Braga District. Having had no impact whatsoever in two years at S.C. Braga he moved to the second division with G.D. Chaves, after which he signed with CF Extremadura in Spain, also in the second tier.

After his team suffered relegation in 2002, Pereira returned to his country, helping lowly Moreirense F.C. retain their Primeira Liga status until 2005 and subsequently joining U.D. Leiria, where his competitive input consisted of nine minutes.

Following Angola's participation at the 2006 FIFA World Cup finals, Pereira moved to Atlético Petróleos Luanda and remained at the club two years, after which he moved to Cyprus to continue his career. In 2010 he switched to Luxembourg, representing CS Muhlenbach Lusitanos for three seasons.

Coaching career
Pereira started working as a player-coach with Muhlenbach Lusitanos – renamed FC Blue Boys Muhlenbach in 2012 – also serving in both capacities for some time at his new club US Sandweiler. In May 2018, he was appointed head coach of another side in the country, US Esch.

On 20 August 2019, after three games and as many losses at the helm of FC Rodange 91, Pereira resigned. On 11 November that year, he signed with FC Mamer 32.

References

External links

1978 births
Living people
People from Vieira do Minho
Sportspeople from Braga District
Portuguese footballers
Association football midfielders
Primeira Liga players
Liga Portugal 2 players
S.C. Braga players
G.D. Chaves players
Moreirense F.C. players
U.D. Leiria players
Segunda División players
CF Extremadura footballers
Girabola players
Atlético Petróleos de Luanda players
Cypriot Second Division players
Olympiakos Nicosia players
Onisilos Sotira players
Luxembourg National Division players
FC Blue Boys Muhlenbach players
FC Mamer 32 players
US Sandweiler players
Portugal youth international footballers
Portuguese expatriate footballers
Expatriate footballers in Spain
Expatriate footballers in Angola
Expatriate footballers in Cyprus
Expatriate footballers in Luxembourg
Portuguese expatriate sportspeople in Spain
Portuguese expatriate sportspeople in Angola
Portuguese expatriate sportspeople in Cyprus
Portuguese expatriate sportspeople in Luxembourg
Portuguese football managers
Portuguese expatriate football managers
Expatriate football managers in Luxembourg